David Komatz (born 10 December 1991) is an Austrian biathlete. He has competed in the Biathlon World Cup since 2013, and represented Austria at the Biathlon World Championships 2016 and Biathlon World Championships 2021.

At the 2021 World Championships he won the silver medal in the mixed relay.

Career

World Championships
2 medal (2 silver)

*During Olympic seasons competitions are only held for those events not included in the Olympic program.
**The single mixed relay was added as an event in 2019.

References

External links

1991 births
Living people
Austrian male biathletes
Biathlon World Championships medalists
Biathletes at the 2022 Winter Olympics
Olympic biathletes of Austria